The Kochi metropolitan area or Kochi urban agglomeration is a metropolitan area centered around the city of Kochi, in Ernakulam district, Kerala, India. With a population of more than 2.1 million within an area of 440 km², it is the most populous metropolitan area in Kerala.

Municipalities and Panchayaths
The area constituted on the basis of census data 2011, consists of Kochi Municipal Corporation, 9 municipalities, 15 Panchayaths and parts of 4 Panchayaths. The 9 municipalities are Aluva, Thrippunithura, Maradu, Thrikkakara, Kalamassery, Eloor, North Paravur, Perumbavoor and Angamali. The fifteen Panchayaths consists of Chengamanad, Nedumbassery, Cheranelloor, Varapuzha, Chennamangalam, Kadamakkudy, Mulavukad, Kadungalloor, Alengad, Chottanikkara, Choornikkara, Edathala, Kizhakkambalam, Kumbalam, Kottuvally and Vypin Island. .

The state government and the GCDA have plans to include Mala and Kodungallur in Thrissur district; Piravom and Kolenchery in Ernakulam district; Thalayolaparambu and Vaikom in Kottayam; and Cherthala in Alappuzha district within the Kochi metropolitan limits.

History

Kochi was the princely state under the Kingdom of Kochi which came into existence in 1102, after the fall of the Kulasekhara empire. The princely state had the Kochi mainland as the capital. The state was ruled by Cochin Royal Family.

On the earlier days, the kingdom of Kochi was always under the shadow of the attacks from Samoothirippadu (often anglicised as Zamorin), the ruler of Malabar the northern neighbour. From 1503 to 1663, Kochi was allied to Portugal. Kochi hosted the grave of Vasco da Gama, the first European explorer to set sail for India, who was buried at St. Francis Church until his remains were returned to Portugal in 1539. The Dutch, who had allied with the Zamorins in order to conquer Kochi, later became an ally of Kochi.

In the battle of Ambalapuzha (3 January 1754), the Dutch allied Kochi was defeated by Marthanda Varma of Travancore (who was allied with United Kingdom) after he defeated the Dutch in the Battle of Colachel-1741. In 1757 AD, a treaty was concluded between Travancore and Cochin, ensuring peace and stability on the Southern border. By 1773, the Mysore King Hyder Ali extended his conquest in the Malabar region to Kochi, forcing it to become a tributary of Mysore. The hereditary Prime Ministership of Kochi held by the Paliath Achans came to an end during this period. The Dutch, who feared an outbreak of war on the Dutch Republic signed a treaty with the United Kingdom, had left South India by then. This was in exchange for the island of Bangka as per the treaty. Kochi was thus under the British rule, till India gained independence in 1947.

In 1949, Travancore-Cochin state came into being with the merger of Cochin and Travancore. After the King of Kochi refused to take any official position, The King of Travancore was made the Rajpramukh of the Travancore-Cochin Union from 1949 to 1956. Travancore-Cochin, was in turn merged with the Malabar district of the Madras State. Finally, the Government of India's States Reorganisation Act (1956) inaugurated a new state Kerala; incorporating Travancore-Cochin (excluding the four southern Taluks which were merged with Madras State), Malabar District, and the taluk of Kasargod, South Kanara.

The Kochi urban agglomeration was defined in 1998, with the corporation of Cochin, municipalities of North Paravur Aluva, Angamaly, Kalamassery, and 11 adjoining villages.

Economy 

Kochi is known as the financial and economic capital of Kerala.

The economic growth gathered momentum after economic reforms in India introduced by the central government in the mid-1990s. Since 2000, the service sector has energized the economy. Over the years, the city has witnessed rapid commercialisation, and has today grown into the commercial capital of Kerala.

See also
Kochi Municipal Corporation

References

External links 

 Government of Kerala – Ernakulam Portal
 Government of India – Ernakulam Portal

Populated coastal places in India
Cities and towns in Ernakulam district
Metropolitan areas of India